Thanks for Listening  is the fifth studio album by American country rap artist Colt Ford.  Released on July 1, 2014 via Average Joe's Entertainment, the album features singles "Workin' On","Crank It Up", "The High Life". and "Dirty Side".

Content
The album was mostly produced by Shannon "Fat Shan" Houchins and Noah Gordon, except for tracks 3, 5, and 10, which were produced by Phivestarr Productions (Jared Sciullo and DJKO), and track 8, which was produced by Kevin Kadish.

Promotion
Along with the release of the album, a comic book included in the deluxe package of the available at Walmart was released entitled The Average Joes — a reference to Ford's record label — which features Ford and others involved with his record company saving the world and fighting crime.

Critical reception
Giving it 3.5 stars out of 5, Steve Leggett of Allmusic wrote that "There isn't much Nashville about Ford, but he certainly understands how things work, and most importantly, he understands his audience, realizing that, while radio segments music into styles, audiences don't".

Commercial performance
The album debuted at number ten on the Billboard 200 selling 23,000 copies.  It also debuted at No. 2 on the Top Country album chart, and No. 1 on the Rap Albums as well as Independent Albums charts. It has sold 95,200 copies in the US as of March 2015.

Track listing

Charts

Weekly charts

Year-end charts

Singles

References 

2014 albums
Colt Ford albums
Average Joes Entertainment albums